Minenwerfer is an American black metal band. It was founded in 2007 in Sacramento, California.

History
The band started in 2007 as a solo project of Bret Tardiff ("Generalfeldmarschall Kriegshammer"), a multi-instrumentalist. He released a lo-fi demo in December 2007 but had no long-term plans. He was later joined by Patrick Jimmose ("Oberstleutnant Angeltits"). Together, they recorded their debut studio album Volkslieder, which was a major step forward in terms of production quality. They released a split single with the martial industrial band Striider shortly after.

Martial industrial elements also appeared on the band's second studio album, Nihilistischen, released in May 2012. An improvement in sound quality was made once again, as the recording took place in a studio. Jimmose was not very active anymore at that point. He eventually left and was replaced by Nick Liuzzi („Wachtmeister Verwüstung“).

Minenwerfer temporarily disbanded in 2014 due to a lack of time and financial issues. They collaborated with other metal bands (Sturmtiger, 1914, Kommandant) on several split albums before reestablishing in 2016. In August 2018, the band announced on Facebook that the recording of their third studio album had begun. On September 7, 2019, it was announced that work on Alpenpässe was finished and the record was to be released soon. Three days later the cover art, overall theme as well as one song were unveiled. The album itself was released on October 31.

Influences, style, theme
The founder of the band, Bret Tardiff, claims its sound was inspired by many other black metal bands, namely Marduk, Endstille, Hate Forest and Impaled Nazarene. 

Minenwerfer focuses on the first world war and nihilism in their songs, featuring English and German lyrics. This is reflected in their title (Minenwerfer was a type of mortar used by Germany in the first world war) and logo. Until the release of Kriegserklärung in 2014, all records simply featured the band's name in gothic writing. Since the EP was written from the point of view of Austria-Hungary, the Austrian-Hungarian coat of arms was present instead. Afterwards, the band's logo became the iron cross, as the lyrics focused on Germany once again. Tardiff stated in a 2019 interview that the coat of arms would be seen again; it appeared on the 2019 Alpenpässe.

Discography

Studio albums
 Volkslieder (2010)
 Nihilistischen (2012)
 Alpenpässe (2019)

Compilation albums
 Vorleben Erinnerung (2020)

EPs
 Der Rote Kampfflieger (2011)
 Kriegserklärung (2014)

Demos
 Kaiserreich (2007)
 Alle Beruhigen Sich Auf Der West Vorderseite (2009)
 Vorwärts (2010)

Members
Current
 Bret Tardiff „Generalfeldmarschall Kriegshammer“ – vocals, rhythm guitar, bass
 Nick Liuzzi „Wachtmeister Verwüstung“ – guitar, drums

Former
 Patrick Jimmose „Oberstleutnant Angeltits“ – guitar
 Jim Boots „Feldwebel Rabenkrähe“ – drums
 Pete Chavez „Oberst Gemetzel“ – drums
 Trevor Deschryver „Hauptmann Hymen Burster Von Richthofen“ – drums (live performances only)

References

External links
Minenwerfer on Bandcamp

Black metal musical groups from California
Musical groups established in 2007
Heavy metal duos
Musical groups from Sacramento, California